This is a list of airports in Chile, sorted by location.



Airports 
Airport names shown in bold indicate the airport has scheduled commercial airline service. Links to Spanish language Wikipedia are added for some communities.

See also 
 List of the busiest airports in Chile
 Directorate General of Civil Aviation (Chile)
 Transportation in Chile
 List of airports by ICAO code: S#SC – Chile
 Wikipedia:WikiProject Aviation/Airline destination lists: South America#Chile

References 
 Dirección General de Aeronáutica Civil (DGAC)
 AIP Chile
 Airports in Chile from Aerodromo.cl
 
 
  - includes IATA codes
 Great Circle Mapper: Airports in Chile – IATA and ICAO codes
 World Aero Data: Chile – ICAO codes
 Airport records for Chile at Landings.com. Retrieved 2013-08-29

Airports
Chile
Airports
Chile